Liceo Técnico Santa Cruz de Triana is a Chilean high school located in Rancagua, Cachapoal Province, Chile.

The high school emphasizes abilities in arts, and sports: one of its students earned a gold medal at the national tournament Juegos Bicentenario, in the category of high jump.

References 

Educational institutions with year of establishment missing
Secondary schools in Chile
Schools in Cachapoal Province